Love Vibes is a Japanese manga by Erica Sakurazawa. It was adapted into a 2009 live action film titled Kakera: A Piece of Our Life.

Plot
Shouji has a girlfriend but is seeing Mako on the side. Unable to continue pretending she feels less for him than she does, she breaks it off with him. Shortly before that happens, Mako is hit on by Mika, who tells Mako that she's interested in both men and women. Mika wants to pursue a relationship with Mako, but is Mako's relationship with Shouji really over?

Media

Manga
Love Vibes began as a manga series written and illustrated by Erica Sakurazawa, which began serialization in Shueisha Young You manga magazine. The first bound volume was released on September 19, 1996.

Kakera (film)

Kakera (カケラ), the 2009 live action film adaptation of Love Vibes, had its world premiere on 7 October 2009 at the 17th Raindance Film Festival (London);  It was released in Japan on 3 April 2010, following the theatrical release in March 2010.

Directed by Momoko Ando and produced by Zero Pictures, it stars Hikari Mitsushima and Eriko Nakamura. The movie was distributed in the United Kingdom by Third Window Films as Kakera: A Piece of Our Life.

The DVD was released on 21 June 2010.

Cast and characters
Hikari Mitsushima as Haru Kitagawa 
Eriko Nakamura as Riko Sakata
Tasuku Nagaoka as Ryota Shinoduka
Ken Mitsuishi as Syogo Sakata
Toshie Negishi as Keiko Sakata
Masahiko Tsugawa as Tanaka
Rino Katase as Toko Yamashiro

See also
List of LGBT-related films
List of LGBT-related films directed by women
Lists of manga

References

External links

Official film website 
 Kakera: A Piece of Our Life at Zero Pictures
 Kakera: A Piece of Our Life at Third Window Films 
'Kakera DVD'' at Terracotta Distribution

 Kakera at British Film Institute
Kakera (A Piece of Our Life) at FilmAffinity

Kakera at Japanese Film Database

1996 manga
2009 films
2009 LGBT-related films
Japanese drama films
Japanese LGBT-related films
Josei manga
Lesbian-related films
Live-action films based on manga
Manga adapted into films
Shueisha franchises
Shueisha manga
Yuri (genre) anime and manga
Bisexuality-related films
2000s Japanese films